SMBC may refer to:

Companies and organizations
 SMBC Aviation Capital, an aircraft leasing company associated with the bank
 Sumitomo Mitsui Banking Corporation, a bank based in Japan
 Sydney Missionary and Bible College

Government and politics
 Sefton Metropolitan Borough Council, in Merseyside, England
 Solihull Metropolitan Borough Council, in West Midlands, England
 Stockport Metropolitan Borough Council, in Greater Manchester, England

Media and entertainment
 Saturday Morning Breakfast Cereal, a webcomic
 Super Mario Bros. Crossover, an online video game

Other uses
 × Schombocattleya, an orchid 
 Single mother by choice